Olivia Travel is a travel company that sells cruises and resort vacations marketed towards lesbian customers. It was founded by Judy Dlugacz in 1973 as a women's record label, Olivia Records. It offered its first all-woman cruise in 1990 and remains the only company in the world offering cruises catering just to lesbians. Like its parent company, Olivia takes its name from the heroine of a pulp novel by Dorothy Bussy who fell in love with her headmistress at a French boarding school.

The company has attracted attention due to endorsements from lesbian celebrities, such as golfer Rosie Jones (who was the first professional athlete in America to endorse a gay-oriented company) tennis player Martina Navratilova and basketball player Sheryl Swoopes. Entertainers who have performed on Olivia cruises include the Indigo Girls and Margaret Cho.

The company was involved in mild controversy in 1998 when its attempt to buy an ad on the sitcom Ellens anticipated "coming out" episode was rejected by ABC.

See also
 Gay marketing
 List of gay resort areas
 R Family Vacations for LGBT families.
 Racquet Club of Palm Springs – a defunct tennis club now owned by Olivia Communities

References

Companies based in San Francisco
Transport companies established in 1973
Lesbian organizations in the United States
LGBT tourism
Travel and holiday companies of the United States
1973 establishments in California